A kontor was a major foreign trading post of the Hanseatic League.<ref>{{cite book
 |last= Burckhardt
 |first= Mike
 |editor1-last= Harreld
 |editor1-first= Donald J.
 |date= 2015
 | chapter = Kontors and Outposts
 |title= A Companion to the Hanseatic League
 |series = Brill's Companions to European History
 |language=en
 |location= Leiden, Boston
 |publisher= Brill
 |isbn= 978-90-04-28288-9
 |quote=Traditionally the Stalhof in London, the kontor in Bruges, Bryggen in Bergen, and Peterhof in Novgorod are known as the kontors of the Hanse. Similar, but smaller Hanseatic trading posts in other towns were referred to as outposts or 'Faktoreien.
}}</ref>

In addition to the kontore in London (the Steelyard), Bruges, Bergen (Bryggen), and Novgorod (Peterhof), some ports had a representative merchant and a warehouse.

Etymology
Through Middle Low German , from French , from Latin  "calculate, compute". After spreading via the League, the word  continues to mean "office" in the Scandinavian languages and in Estonian, while  is used in Dutch.

Archaeology
Of all the kontor buildings, only Bergen's kontor, known as Bryggen in Norway, has survived until the present day. The Hanseatic kontor at Bryggen was closed in 1754 and replaced by a "Norwegian kontor", run by Norwegian citizens, but still with a large element of German immigrants. Bergen's kontor'' is on the UNESCO list of the World Cultural Heritage sites.

The Hanseatic Warehouse in King's Lynn in Norfolk, England survives, but was converted into offices in 1971.

References